Herberts Corner, New Jersey may refer to:

Herberts Corner, Monmouth County, New Jersey
Herberts, New Jersey in Middlesex County